Highway 915 is a provincial highway in the north-east region of the Canadian province of Saskatchewan. It runs from Highway 102 to Stanley Mission within the Lac La Ronge First Nation. Highway 915 is about 36 km (22 mi) long.

For almost its entire length, Highway 915 lies within the Lac La Ronge Provincial Park. An intersection with Anglo Rouyn Road is about 3 km from Highway 102.

See also 
Roads in Saskatchewan
Transportation in Saskatchewan

References 

915